(–)-δ-Cadinene synthase (EC 4.2.3.97) is an enzyme with systematic name (2E,6E)-farnesyl-diphosphate diphosphate-lyase (cyclizing, (–)-δ-cadinene-forming). This enzyme catalyses the following chemical reaction

 (2E,6E)-farnesyl diphosphate  (–)-δ-cadinene + diphosphate

The cyclization mechanism involves an intermediate nerolidyl diphosphate.

References

External links 
 

EC 4.2.3